National Agricultural Research Centre (NARC) is a research institution of the Pakistan Agricultural Research Council (PARC) based in Islamabad, Pakistan.  It works in collaboration with Ministry of National Food Security and Research which is headed by a Federal Minister, Khusro Bakhtiar. He is heading the ministry since 19 November 2019.

Research institutes
 Crop Sciences Institute (CSI)
 Horticulture Research Institute (HRI)
 Agricultural Engineering Institute (AEI)
 Honeybee Research Institute (HBRI)
 Social Sciences Research Institute (SSRI)
 Institute of Plant & Environmental Protection (IPEP)
 Food Sciences Research Institute (FSRI)
 Land Resources Research Institute (LRRI)
 Animal Sciences Institute (ASI)
 Crops Diseases Research Institute (CDRI)
 Climate Energy & Water Research Institute (CEWRI)
 Bio Resources Conservation Institute (BCI)
 National Institute of Genomics & Advanced Biotechnology (NIGAB)
 Rangeland Research Institute (RRI)

Events

In 2015, Chief Justice of Pakistan intervened and took notice on a land issue that involved converting land owned by National Agricultural Research Centre (NARC) into a residential housing society scheme.
In October 2019, World Food Day was observed at an event at the National Agricultural Research Centre (NARC) in Islamabad. This event was organized by the United Nations Food & Agriculture Organization, Pakistan's Ministry of National Food Security and Research, Pakistan Agricultural Research Council (PARC) and the World Food Programme (WFP). The theme for 2019 was – 'Our actions are our future: healthy diets for a zero hunger world'.

References

External links
 NARC-PARC official website

Pakistan federal departments and agencies
Science and technology in Pakistan
Constituent institutions of Pakistan Atomic Energy Commission
Research Centres in Pakistan